William H. Comrie (born June 29, 1950) is a Canadian businessman. He is the founder of The Brick, one of Canada's largest volume retailers of furniture, mattresses, appliances and home electronics.

Early life
Comrie was born on June 29, 1950, in Winnipeg, Manitoba and grew up in Edmonton, Alberta.

He played junior hockey with the Moose Jaw Canucks, a Chicago Blackhawks farm team, and later the Edmonton Oil Kings, but retired from hockey in 1968 to enter into the family furniture business following the death of his father Herb, eventually turning down an invitation to a Blackhawks training camp.

Personal life
Comrie is the father of professional ice hockey players Mike, Paul, and Eric Comrie. He has a grandson named Luca through Mike's former marriage to Hilary Duff.

References

External links
 The Brick Group

1950 births
Living people
Businesspeople from Edmonton
Businesspeople from Winnipeg
BC Lions owners
BC Lions team presidents
Ice hockey people from Edmonton
Sportspeople from Winnipeg